Lars Gabriel von Haartman  (23 September 1789 Turku - 16 December 1859 Merimasku) was a Swedish-speaking Finnish politician. Along with Count Gustaf Mauritz Armfelt, he was one of the most prominent politicians who were in favour of developing Finland as part of the Russian Empire instead of striving towards independence.

Biography 
Lars travelled with his father, Gabriel Haartman, to St. Petersburg in 1808 when he was 19 years old. Being a representative of the Turku Academy in St. Petersburg, Gabriel Haartman made a great influence on his son's future. Lars joined Ministry of foreign affairs of Russia at a young age, and already in 1811 he became an official of the committee on Finnish Affairs and Secretary to the chancellor of the Turku Academy, and remained in St. Petersburg until 1827. During two years (1827-1829) he made a trip to Sweden, Denmark, Northern Italy, the Netherlands, Belgium, France and England.

Haartman's spouse since 1820 was Maria Sofia Mannerheim, daughter of Count Carl Erik Mannerheim, and from 1831 was Eva Wilhelmina Charlotta Mannerheim, sister of the first spouse. The landowner, Reichstag Carl August Gabriel von Haartman (1844-1927) was the son of Lars Gabriel von Haartman from his second marriage.

In 1831 Lars became a governor of Turku and Pori provinces. Haartman was also elected chairman of the Finnish Economic Society. As a result of Haartman's activities, the Mustiala Agricultural College was established in 1840. 

He was a Vice-chairman of the economic division of the Senate of Finland (1841–1858).

Lars Haartman died at the age of 70, in 1859.

References

Further reading
 

1789 births
1859 deaths
People from Turku
Finnish politicians
Finnish senators
Swedish-speaking Finns
Finnish people of German descent
19th-century Finnish people
Barons of the Russian Empire